Lee Kwang-suk  (born March 5, 1975) is a retired South Korean football player.

External links 
 

1975 births
Living people
South Korean footballers
K League 1 players
Korea National League players
Jeonbuk Hyundai Motors players
Gimcheon Sangmu FC players
Gyeongnam FC players
Jeonnam Dragons players

Association football goalkeepers